Aubigny is a rural town and locality in the Toowoomba Region, Queensland, Australia.

Geography 
The former locality of Tangkam is in the northern part of Aubigny. It took its name from the Tangkam railway station on the Cecil Plains railway line. The name Tangkam is believed to be an Aboriginal word meaning sour.

The Toowoomba–Cecil Plains Road runs along the southern boundary, and the Oakey-Pittsworth Road passes through from north-east to south-west.

History

Crosshill State School opened on 9 August 1880 and closed on 1940. It was at 317 Ciesiolka Road.

Aubigny was at the centre of the Westbrook Homestead area.

The town lots were offered for sale in the new town of Aubigny in December 1885, but only two lots were sold at that time, one to the Lutheran church and one to the Catholic church.

St John's Lutheran Church opened in 1886. On Sunday 22 September 1929, a new larger church was built with the 1886 church becoming the church hall. 

Aubigny Post Office opened around September 1907 (a receiving office had been open since 1894) and closed in 1968.

Aubigny State School opened 24 January 1921 and closed about 27 October 1967. It was at 1309 Oakey Pittsworth Road.

The town was serviced by the Cecil Plains railway line between 1915 and 1994.

Tangkam State School opened on 26 November 1918. It closed on 22 January 1961. It was at 25 Brennan Road.

Education 
There are no schools in Aubigny. The nearest government primary schools are Oakey State School in neighbouring Oakey to the north and Biddeston State School in neighbouring Biddeston to the east. The nearest government secondary school is Oakey State High School, also in Oakey.

Amenities 
St John's Lutheran Church is at 2 Aubigny Crosshill Road. It is part of the Australian Evangelican Lutheran Church.

References

Further reading 

 
  — includes Gowrie Little Plains School, Aubigny School, Crosshill School, Devon Park State School, Silverleigh State School, Boodua School, Greenwood State School, Kelvinhaugh State School

External links 

 

Towns in Queensland
Toowoomba Region
Localities in Queensland